In March 2004, the South African television show Top Billing announced that it would launch a magazine version of the lifestyle programme. In June 2004, Top Billing magazine was being sold nationwide for R19.95. The Top Billing magazine contains celebrity interviews, behind-the-scenes previews, fashion, food, travel and entertainment news of local and international status.

References

2004 establishments in South Africa
Lifestyle magazines
Magazines established in 2004
Magazines published in South Africa